Großwarasdorf (until 1894 Baromlak, between 1894 and 1920) is a town in the district of Oberpullendorf in the state of Burgenland in eastern Austria.

Population

References

Cities and towns in Oberpullendorf District